Clarence D. Lane (March 17, 1921 – December 7, 1998) was an American politician who served in the New York State Assembly from 1963 to 1986.

References

1921 births
1998 deaths
Republican Party members of the New York State Assembly
20th-century American politicians